The Cigar Mile Handicap is a Grade I American thoroughbred horse race for horses aged three-years-old and older held in late November or early December at Aqueduct Racetrack in Queens, New York. Typically New York's final Grade I thoroughbred stakes race of the year, the Cigar Mile is run over a distance of one mile and carries a purse of $750,000.

History

The inaugural running of the event, then known as the NYRA Mile Handicap or simply the NYRA Mile, was won in 1988 by three-year-old Forty Niner, who would later become an influential sire.  The race was eligible for graded stakes classification in 1990 and was awarded Grade I status by the American Graded Stakes Committee.

The 1994 NYRA Mile was the second race in the 16-race win streak of Cigar, who won by seven lengths. The event was renamed in 1997 following Cigar's retirement to the Cigar Mile Handicap. Horses who have won the Cigar Mile on their way to championship honors include 2006 winner Discreet Cat (named one of the year's champion three-year-olds in the World's Best Racehorse Rankings), 2009 winner Kodiak Kowboy (winner of that year's Eclipse Award for Champion Sprinter), and 2019 victor Maximum Security (that year's Eclipse winner for Best Three-Year-Old Male).

Records
Speed record:
 1:32.46 – Discreet Cat (2006)

Margins:
 7 lengths – Cigar (1994)

Most wins:
 2 – Congaree (2002, 2003)

Most wins by a jockey:
 5 – Jerry Bailey (1994, 1998, 2000, 2002, 2003)

Most wins by a trainer:
 6 – Todd A. Pletcher (2001, 2004, 2005, 2012, 2021, 2022)

Most wins by an owner:
 2 – Michael B. Tabor (2001, 2004)
 2 – Stonerside Stable (2002, 2003)
2 – Charles E. Fipke (2008, 2010)

Winners

Notes:

† In the 2006 running of the event Harlem Rocker was first past the post in a photo finish by a nose margin but was disqualified for interference in the straight and was placed second. Tale of Ekati was declared the official winner of the event.

See also
List of American and Canadian Graded races

External sites
 Ten Things You Should Know About the Cigar Mile at Hello Race Fans!

References

Grade 1 stakes races in the United States
Horse races in New York City
Open mile category horse races
Recurring sporting events established in 1988
Aqueduct Racetrack
1988 establishments in New York City